M7 Group (legally Canal+ Luxembourg S.à.r.l.) is a Luxembourg-based television provider which operates several direct broadcast satellite pay TV platforms: HD Austria in Austria, Télésat in Belgium and Luxembourg, TV Vlaanderen in the Flanders region in Belgium, Skylink in Czech Republic and Slovakia, Canal Digitaal in the Netherlands, Focus Sat in Romania, and Direct One in Hungary. It also operates a terrestrial pay television platform in Flanders, Belgium and offers B2B multimedia services.

History

The private equity firm Astorg acquired a majority of the company in July 2014 for €350 million via its Fund V from Providence and Airbridge Investments. Providence is a Private Equity investment firm and Airbridge Investments is the holding company of executives Hans Wolfert and Cees Bohnenn. In December 2017 the company became fully owned by Astorg. The exit of minority shareholders took place at the time of a €570 million debt refinancing which allowed to pay a dividend of €175 million to the former shareholders.

On 30 July 2014, its subsidiary M7 Deutschland bought the German B2B satellite platform Kabelkiosk from Eutelsat.

In 2016 M7 Group closed the Hungarian satellite platform Hello HD.

In December 2018 the company announced the purchase of Liberty Global's satellite operations located in Czech Republic, Slovakia, Hungary and Romania for €180 million. This sale was prcoesed after necessary permissions, in spring 2019. Freesat platform acquired in the Czech Republic and Slovakia has been integrated into Skylink.

On May 28, 2019, it announced that Vivendi's Canal+ Group will take over M7 Group for 1.1 billion euros. The sale was effectuated on 12 September 2019 after the European Commission gave its permission.

M7 Group announced that Diveo, the German satellite platform which was launched in February 2018, will be closed on 30 November 2019. In July 2020, M7 Group S.A. merged with UPC DTH S.à.r.l. and changed its official name into Canal+ Luxembourg S.à.r.l. The M7 brand name remains in use with the "A Canal+ Group company" tagline.

References

External links
 

 
Direct broadcast satellite services
Groupe Canal+
Television in Austria
Television in Belgium
Television in the Czech Republic
Television in Hungary
Television in the Netherlands
Television in Romania
Television in Slovakia
Television in Germany
2019 mergers and acquisitions